Phlebodium is a small genus of ferns in the family Polypodiaceae, subfamily Polypodioideae, according to the Pteridophyte Phylogeny Group classification of 2016 (PPG I). It is native to tropical and subtropical regions of the Americas. Its species were formerly included in Polypodium.

They are epiphytic ferns, with a creeping, densely hairy or scaly rhizome bearing fronds at intervals along its length. The fronds are evergreen, persisting for 1–2 years, and are pinnatifid. The sori or groups of spore-cases (sporangia) are borne on the back of the frond.

Species 
, Checklist of Ferns and Lycophytes of the World accepted the following species:
Phlebodium areolatum (Humb. & Bonpl. ex Willd.) J.Sm., including Phlebodium araneosum (M.Martens & Galeotti) Mickel & Beitel and Phlebodium pseudoaureum (Cav.) Lellinger
Phlebodium aureum (L.) J.Sm.
Phlebodium decumanum (Willd.) J.Sm.

See also
 Calaguala

References

Polypodiaceae
Epiphytes
Fern genera